Lutter is a German television series starring Joachim Król.

See also
List of German television series

External links
 

2006 German television series debuts
2010 German television series endings
German crime television series
2000s German police procedural television series
Television shows set in North Rhine-Westphalia
German-language television shows
ZDF original programming